The Dodé Valley or Dog bde is a northern suburb of Lhasa, Tibet. A number of historical hermitages belonging to Sera Monastery are located here including the Purbuchok Hermitage and Sera Utsé Hermitage. The hills around the valley are known as the Purbuchok mountains. It is a common location for hiking from Lhasa.

References

Populated places in Lhasa
Chengguan District, Lhasa
Valleys of Tibet